Marc Bauer (born May 28, 1975, Geneva, Switzerland) is an artist best known for his works in the graphic medium, primarily drawing.

Life and career 
Marc Bauer studied at the Ecole supérieure d’art visuel (now HEAD) in Geneva and the Rijksakademie van beeldende kunsten, in Amsterdam. He lives and works in Berlin and Zurich. 

Bauer's works have been exhibited worldwide at institutions including group exhibitions at the Guggenheim Museum Bilbao (2021); Migros Museum, Zurich (2019); Kunsthaus Zurich (2019); S.M.A.K., Ghent (2015); Albertina Museum, Vienna (2015); Centre Pompidou (2011 and 2014).
And solo exhibitions notably at the Berlinische Galerie (2020-2021); Istituto Svizzero, Milan (2020); Drawing Room, London (2019); Museum Folkwang, Essen (2014); Centre Culturel Suisse, Paris (2013); Kunstmuseum St. Gallen (2011); MAMCO, Geneva (2010) and was included in 2018 Biennale of Sydney and the 2014 Liverpool Biennial.

In 2020 Bauer was the laureate of the Swiss Grand Award for Art / Prix Meret Oppenheim. and in the same year received the GASAG Art Prize.

Since 2015 Marc Bauer is permanent lecturer at Zurich University of the Arts (ZHdK).

Work

Style and technique 

Bauer's graphic work is rendered almost exclusively in black-and-white, a pared-down aesthetic that seems deliberately evocative of old photographs. In scale, his graphic work varies widely, from small works on paper to large-scale images comprising several sheets pieced together, to digital prints made of blow-ups of his drawings, and even enormous wall drawings, rendered directly on the wall. Other supports for his work have included ceramic vases and coated Dibond aluminium panels.
Bauer often produces works in series, and his exhibitions are usually conceived as site-specific installations that address the exhibition space as a larger composition. These installations frequently include a non-hierarchical arrangement of drawings – mostly unframed – pinned onto the walls, as well as drawings (often studies for the larger works) sometimes presented in specimen display cases to be viewed from above, textual accompaniments (sometimes even drawings of handwritten material such as letters), projections of earlier graphic works, objects (usually ones featured in a drawing), and large graphic murals made on the gallery's walls expressly for the show, which often add an illusionistic element to the overall display.

Notably, Bauer's installations also often feature drawings from earlier series, and this "recycling" leads to their ongoing re-contextualization and serves to underscore long-running themes that are then presented in a new, sometimes topical light. A good example of this is Bauer's continual (possibly even anachronistic) exploration of the theme of fascism, viewed most recently from the perspective of the Gurlitt case and the Nazi's "Degenerate Art" campaign.

Visually, Bauer's works are typically dark in tone and the contours of his figures are often blurred, through his practice of using a hard thin eraser to rub away and smear the graphite and lithographic chalk and to achieve a sense of depth. This blurring effect partly gives Bauer's drawings their distinctive "look" and also subverts the traditional concept of the line as the defining element in the art of drawing, as in some works – especially his landscapes or images of deserted cinemas and swimming pools –  the dense application and distribution of the graphite has, at first glance, a paint-like, textured appearance. This effect culminates in the technique deployed in Bauer's animated film The Architect, in which the application of an oil paint on Plexiglas is captured in thousands of stop-motion images and even becomes a narrative element in itself which propels the story forward.

The blurring created through the repeated erasure and addition of more pencil simulates the process of remembering and forgetting that lies at the heart of Bauer's artistic endeavour, and which is encapsulated in his statement “in order to remember, you need to forget first”. The smudging of contour also echoes techniques traditionally associated with painting, such as sfumato and shows Bauer entering into a centuries-old discourse within the history of art about the possibilities of his chosen medium, contested here not necessarily against the art of painting, but against the supposed sharpness, objectivity, and dominance of the photographic image.

Subject matter 

A key recurring theme in Bauer's art is history and memory – the personal and the collective – which he presents as closely intertwined. Some of his earliest works on paper drew from childhood memories and snapshots from family albums, featuring images of his own relations (as in the 2007 “A viso aperto” sequence from the artist's book History of Masculinity). These were interspersed with images of historical figures from the time, such as Mussolini and Hitler. Through this juxtaposition, the power relations in the family images were infused with broader power dynamics at play among the general populace under fascism.

Over the course of his oeuvre, Bauer's investigation of history and historiography has evolved from the primarily personal (as in “A viso aperto”) to broader social and political histories (e.g. Monument, Roman-Odessa and The will of desire) and increasingly involves him making archival research into his intended subjects beforehand. For instance, for the group show, Sacré 101 – An Exhibition Based on "The Rite of Spring", Bauer accessed the archives of the Ballets Russes to form his own personal impression of the dancer Vaslav Nijinsky and his suffering of schizophrenia. And in preparation for his show at the Aargauer Kunsthaus in 2014, Bauer's research into Hildebrand Gurlitt's involvement in the fate of two works by Karl Ballmer led him to access the archives at the Karl Ballmer Foundation. In both cases, Bauer's use of the archive, usually a touchstone for objectivity, resulted in a highly subjective perspective on his subject.

The subjective view on a historical topic is also achieved through Bauer's frequent invention of characters that provide a narrative structure for his series of drawings. These characters are often teenage boys or young men (as in In the Past, Only, Le Quartier, Quimper, and The Architect), whose actions convey a sense of latent violence and repressed (often homoerotic) desires. The narrative element in Bauer's work is further buoyed up by his repeated appropriation and reworking of well-known films, notably the iconic black-and-white images of silent cinema (Battleship Potemkin in Monument, Roman-Odessa, Nosferatu in The Architect), but also more recent, colour films such as Planet of the Apes, and La Jetée in Fragments of 29 Minutes, 1963. In his use of such sources, Bauer usually selects key images from the film and reworks them as graphically rendered stills. Shown in an elliptical sequence, these series adopt cinematic editing effects that require the spectator to piece together the narrative in their mind, while also tapping into the spectator's collective consciousness, in a process that “explores the way popular culture constructs its myths and symbols”.

A similar effect is achieved through Bauer's practice of culling images from historical photographs. These can range from intimate portrait shots (Martin Heidegger in the work Die Grosse Erwartung von M.H.), to school-photograph-like group portraits, and images of famous historical figures such as Pope Benedict XVI or Goebbels. These portrait drawings nearly always bring attention to the fact that they are derived from photographs and that the sitters are conscious of being portrayed. As such, Bauer can be said not only to reference specific photographs, but also the medium of photography itself as means of capturing moments in time. Accordingly, the atmosphere of Bauer's drawings often convey a characteristic sense of stillness (even when the figures are depicted in motion) and of the images’ “mediatedness”. This exploration of the concept of capturing time is reflected in his recurring interest and depiction of still lifes. By using the medium of drawing, in which each work is the result of a slow process formed by the continual interaction between the eye, mind, and hand, Bauer creates images that are in many ways more “still” than they appear in the photograph on which they are based or if they were shot by camera.

Selected exhibitions

Solo
2021 L’Etat de la mer (Lame de fond, 2011-2020), FRAC Auvergne, Clermont-Ferrand
2020 The Blow-Up Regime, Berlinische Galerie, Berlin
2020 Mal Ȇtre / Performance, De La Warr Pavilion, Bexhill on Sea
2020 Mi piace Commenta Condividi, A Rhetorical Figure, Istituto Svizzero Milano
2019 Mal Ȇtre / Performance, Drawing Room, London
2018 Avondland, Deweer Gallery, Otegem
2017 An unser Schicksal von Heute und Morgen, Galerie Peter Kilchmann, Zurich
2016 Focus sur les collections Marc Bauer, Le Bal, Musée Jenisch, Vevey
2015  EMPEROR ME, Freymond-Guth Fine Arts Ltd., Zurich
2015 Cinerama, Frac Provence-Alpes-Côte d'Azur, Marseille
2015 Static / Unfolding Time, Deweer Gallery, Otegem
2014 Cinerama, Frac Alsace, Sélestat
2014 Der Sammler, Museum Folkwang, Essen
2014 In the past, only, Le Quartier, Quimper
2014 Cinerama, Frac Auvergne, Clermont-Ferrand
2013 The Astronaut, Freymond-Guth Fine Arts, Zurich
2013 Le Collectionneur, Centre Culturel Suisse, Paris
2012 Pleins Pouvoirs, septembre, La Station, Nice
2012 Le ravissement mais l'aube, déjà, Musée d'art de Pully, Lausanne. With Sara Masüger
2012 Nature as Territory, Kunsthaus Baselland, Muttenz/Basel
2011 Totstell-Reflexe, partly with Christine Abbt, Kunstmuseum St. Gallen, St. Gallen
2010 Premier conte sur le pouvoir, MAMCO, Geneva
2009 LAQUE, Frac Auvergne, Clermont-Ferrand
2007 History of Masculinity, attitudes, Geneva
2006 Geschichte der Männlichkeit III, o.T. Raum für aktuelle Kunst, Lucerne
2005 Overthrowing the King in His Own Mind, with Shahryar Nashat and Alexia Walther, Kunstmuseum Solothurn, Solothurn
2004 Tautology, Stedelijk Museum Bureau, Amsterdam
2004 Happier Healthier, Store Gallery, London
2001 Archeology, attitudes, Geneva
2000 Swiss Room, Art-Magazin, Zurich

Group 
2021 Los locos años veinte / The Roaring Twenties, Guggenheim Bilbao. Curated by Petra Joos and Cathérine Hug
2021 XXL Le dessin contemporain en grand, Musée Jenisch, 
2021 Réserve du Patron, Kunstmuseum Solothurn
2020 Schall und Rauch, Kunsthaus Zurich. Curated by Cathérine Hug
2019 United by AIDS - An Exhibition about Loss, Remembrance, Activism and Art in Response to HIV/AIDS, Migros Museum, Zurich. Curated by Raphael Gygax
2019 Anatomy of Political Melancholy, The Athens Conservatory, Athens. Curated by Katerina Gregos
2018 21st Biennale of Sydney, Sydney Australia. Curated by Mami Kataoka
2018 Autofiktionen - Zeichnung der Gegenwart, Wilhelm Hack museum, Ludwigshafen
2017 10 Years Guerlain Drawing Prize, Centre Pompidou, Paris
2017 Ewige Gegenwart, Zeitgenössische Kunst Aus Der Graphischen Sammlung Eth Zürich, Helmhaus, Zurich
2017 Cinéma mon amour. Film in Art, Aargauer Kunsthaus, Aarau
2016 Museum Revisited 1996–2016, Migros Museum, Zurich
2016 Nous pourrions danser ensemble, Bâtiment d’Art Contemporain (BAC), Geneva
2016 Retour au meilleur des mondes, Frac Auvergne, Clermont-Ferrand
2016 Il y a de l’autre, Rencontres d’Arles. Curated by Agnès Geoffray and Julie Jones
2016 Donations - Florence & Daniel Guerlain, KUNSTEN Museum of Modern Art, Aalborg. Curated by Jonas Storsve
2016 A quoi tient la beauté des étreintes, Frac Auvergne, Clermont-Ferrand
2015 The Bottom Line, S.M.A.K, Ghent. Curated by Martin Germann and Philippe van Cauteren
2015 Triennial of Contemporary Prints, Musée des beaux-arts, Le Locle.
2015 Europa, Die Zukunft der Geschichte, Kunsthaus Zurich. Curated by Cathérine Hug
2015 Drawing Now, Albertina, Vienna. Curated by Elsy Lahner
2015 Meeting Point, Kunstverein Konstanz. Curated by Axel Lapp
2015 Drawing Biennial, Drawing Room, London
2015 Meisterzeichnungen, 100 Jahre Grafische Sammlung, Kunsthaus Zurich
2014 Docking Station, Aargauer Kunsthaus, Aarau
2014 Liverpool Biennial, curated by Mai Abu ElDahab and Anthony Huberman
2014 Sacré 101 – An Exhibition Based on "The Rite of Spring", Migros Museum für Gegenwartskunst, Zurich. Curated by Raphael Gygax
2013 Donation Florence et Daniel Guerlain, Centre Pompidou, Paris
2013 Les Pléiades - 30 ans des FRAC, Les Abattoirs, Toulouse
2012 Reality Manifestos, or Can Dialectics Break Bricks?, Kunsthalle Exnergasse, Vienna
2011 Le réel est inadmissible, d’ailleurs il n’existe pas, Centre d’Art du Hangar à Bananes, Nantes
2011 The Beirut Experience, Beirut Art Center, Beirut
2011 In erster Linie, Kunstmuseums Solothurn
2010 Voici un dessin Suisse (1990-2010), Musée Rath, Geneva
2009 Usages du document, Centre Culturel Suisse, Paris
2008 Shifting identities, Kunsthaus, Zurich
2004 Fürchte Dich, Helmhaus, Zürich
2004 A Molecular History of Everything, Australian Centre for Contemporary Art, Melbourne
2003 Durchzug/Draft, Kunsthalle, Zürich

Projects 

2015 City hospital Triemli, Zurich. Wall drawings
2015 Wall drawing in Kaufleuten Zurich
2013 Aubusson tapestry in cooperation with Aubusson Tapestry Museum, Melancholia I. Musée de la tapisserie d’Aubusson
2013 La Révolte et L'Ennui, curated exhibition with interventions by Marc Bauer. FRAC Auvergne, Clermont-Ferrand
2013 The Architect, Animated film, 27 minutes. Cooperation between Marc Bauer who animated the film and wrote the script, and the French music group Kafka who composed and performed the music.

Publications 

 White Violence, on domination, displacement and populism. Artist book. Published by FRAC Auvergne
 The Blow-Up Regime, GASAG Kunstpreis 2020. Catalogue/artist book. Published by Berlinische Galerie
 United by AIDS - An Anthology on Art in Response to HIV / AIDS, catalogue. 
 Now-Tomorrow-Flux - An Anthology on the Museum of Contemporary Art. JPR Ringier, 
 The Bottom Line, catalogue. Published by S.M.A.K. Ghent, 
 Drawing Now, catalogue. Published by Albertina, Vienna, 
 Europa, die Zukunft der Geschichte, catalogue, Published by Kunsthaus Zurich. 
 Meisterzeichnungen, 100 Jahre Grafische Sammlung, catalogue. Published by Kunsthaus Zurich. 
 The Architect, artists' book. Published by Frac Auvergne, Alsace and Paca, 2014. 
 The Collector, artists' book. Published by Centre Culturel Suisse, Paris, 2013. 
 Sacré 101 - An Exhibition Based on the Rite of Spring, catalogue. Published by Migros Museum, 2013. 
 VITAMIN D2 - New perspectives in drawing, catalogue. Published by Phaidon, London - New York, 2013. 
 Donation Florence et Daniel Guerlain - Dessins contemporains, catalogue. Published by Centre Pompidou, Paris, 2013. 
 The Beirut Experience, catalogue. Published by attitudes, Genf. 
 MARC BAUER, monographic catalogue. Published by Kehrer, Heidelberg; and Kunstmuseum St.Gallen, 2011. 
 STEEL, artist book. Published by FRAC Auvergne, 2009. 
 History of masculinity, artist book. Published by attitudes, Geneva, 2007. 
 Documents, Marc Bauer: Tautology, writings. Published by Rijksakademie van Beeldende Kunsten, Amsterdam, 2005
 Overthrowing the king in his own mind, catalogue. Published by Kunstmuseum Solothurn and Revolver Editions, 2005. 
 Happier Healthier, artist book in cooperation with Vincent van der Marck and Store Gallery, London, 2004
 Across the Great Channel, artist book. Published by Memory Cage editions, Zürich, 2000.

Prizes 

2020 Prix Meret Oppenheim 2020
2020 GASAG Kunstpreis 2020, Berlin
2011 Prize of the Cité Internationale de la Tapisserie et de l‘Art Tissé, Aubusson
2009 Prix Manor, Geneva
2006 Swiss Art Awards, Basel
2006 Artist residency in Beijing of the GegenwART Foundation, Berne
2005 Swiss Art Awards, Basel
2005 Swiss Institute residency, Rome
2001 Swiss Art Awards, Basel
1999 Prix Théodore Strawinsky, Geneva

Public collections 

 Aargauer Kunsthaus
 Museum Folkwang, Essen
 Centre Pompidou - Musée National d´Art Moderne, Paris
 Musée d'art de Pully, Lausanne
 Migros museum für gegenwartskunst, Zurich
 Kunstmuseum St. Gallen, St. Gallen
 Kunstmuseum Solothurn, Solothurn
 Kunsthaus, Zurich
 Sturzenegger Stiftung, Museum zu Allerheiligen, Schaffhausen
 FRAC Auvergne, Clermont-Ferrand
 FRAC Alsace, Sélestat
 Museo Cantonale d'Arte, Lugano

External links 
 marcbauer.net - Official Website
 Website Galerie Peter Kilchmann - Marc Bauer
 Official website of the exhibition The Blow-Up Regime at the Berlinische Galerie, 2020-2021
 Drawing Room, London - Exhibition Mal Ȇtre / Performance
 Current exhibitions at Artfacts.Net

Videos 
 Clips of The Architect. Vimeo
 Interview with Marc Bauer and images of the exposition La Révolte et l'Ennui at FRAC Auvergne, July 2013. French
 Review of the exhibition Nature as Territory in Kunsthaus Baselland. Art-TV, May 2012. German
 Artist talk at the occasion of the exhibition Totstell-Reflexe at Kunstmuseum St. Gallen, 2011. German
 Video interview with Marc Bauer by FRAC Auvergne, 2009. French

Interviews 
 Interview by Thomas Lapointe for La Revue Entre, 2012. French
 Interview by Laurence Cesa-Mugny for the Swiss Institute for Art Research, October 2009. German

Reviews, articles 
 Article in Interalia Magazine, by Richard Bright. History, memory, masculinity and power balance, March 2020
 Article in the Fourdrinier, by Sara Jaspan. Marc Bauer: Mal Ȇtre / Performance, October 2019
 Review in Frieze Magazine by Aoife Rosenmeyer. Marc Bauer, March 2016
 Article in Frankfurter Allgemeine Zeitung by Julia Voss. Gurlitt und sein Künstlerfreund, September 2, 2014
 Review in Artforum by Riccardo Venturi. Marc Bauer, May 2013
 Article by Benjamin Paul for Artforum. Viewing Distance, January 2011
 Review in Artforum by Valérie Knoll. Gegen mein Gehirn exhibition in Gallerie Elisabeth Kaufmann, 2007

References 

Swiss contemporary artists
Artists from Geneva
1975 births
Living people